Shake, Rattle & Roll 2k5 (also known as Shake, Rattle & Roll VII or Shake, Rattle & Roll 7) is a 2005 Filipino comedy horror anthology film produced by Regal Entertainment, and the seventh installment of the Shake, Rattle & Roll film series. It is an official entry to the 2005 Metro Manila Film Festival.

The eighth installment, Shake, Rattle and Roll 8, was released in 2006.

Plot

"Poso"
The Ispiritista (Ai-Ai delas Alas), a fake occultist, retires from business of communicating with the dead when her last job goes terribly wrong. When a wealthy grandmother (Gloria Romero) promises the Ispiritista and her group; Jay (Rainier Castillo), Gener (Marco Alcaraz), and Frida (Jenine Desiderio) a huge fee to contact their dead grandson, Lucas (Biboy Ramirez), they immediately accept and took it as their last job. The grandmother wants to talk to Lucas the next day because it will be his death anniversary.

After bizarre experiences and nightmares haunt them at night, the Ispiritista, along with Laila (Yasmien Kurdi), the grandmother's caretaker, found out that Lucas was killed by his grandmother, and was buried alive under the construction of the waterpump. Lucas' spirit then drags the grandmother in a pool of blood, ending her life.
The Ispiritista, Jay, and Laila successfully escape the scene but found out that their accomplices, Frida and Gener have fallen victim to the waterpump.

"Aquarium"
Janice (Ara Mina) and her husband Benjie (Ogie Alcasid), along with their son Paul (Paul Salas), and their maid Aciana (Wilma Doesnt) have just moved into a new condo unit. Benjie finds an aquarium with a mask that was left behind by the previous tenants where Janice became suspicious on the aquarium. After this, Janice notices an old lady (Lui Manansala) warning Janice not to touch the aquarium as the old lady disappears. At night, Janice takes a bath when she notices a monstrous hand appears in the door, disappearing into thin air. As she finishes her bath, she finds goldfish in the toilet, scaring her as Benjie appears into hear. When she told Benjie what happened, there were no goldfish to be seen in the toilet.

One day, when Benjie leaves, an old lady appeared once again warns Janice not to touch the aquarium before she closes the door. There she finds that their ceiling is leaking. She enters the Paul's bedroom where Benjie and Paul finished filling the aquarium with water. She became suspicious when there were goldfish on the aquarium. When midnight comes, Janice and Benjie are asleep when water is leaking into her. When she goes to the aquarium, she finds that all of the goldfish are dead on the aquarium as she screams. Benjie tries to call Alex (Reggie Curley), a plumber to fix the leakage. Janice tries to put the alive goldfish away when she notices the same old lady from before. Janice tries to follow the old lady to her room where she cannot enter.

On that day, Paul takes a bath while playing with his toys. Their plumber Alex tries to fix the leakage. After that, Paul is still playing with his toys when something is bubbling in the bathtub. As Alex tries to fix the leakage close to the aquarium, the decorational seagrass came out of the aquarium alive as it tries to shake the ladder to make Alex fall. When he tries to grab his flashligh from the aquarium, his arm gets grabbed by the seagrass. As Paul was still on the bathtub, the monstrous hand from before rises behind him, trying to drown Paul. Alex was grabbed from her upper body into the aquarium, as the two are now drowning by the monstrous beings. Janice saves Paul from drowning in the bathtub. After which, the mask successfully drowns Alex in the aquarium. Janice heard Aciana's screams, as they saw Alex's dead body, making Janice scream in terror.

The police arrived as they investigate Alex's dead body. Janice tries to tell Benjie about the old lady who tries to warn them not to touch the aquarium, as she knocks the old lady's door. When Aciana puts Paul to sleep, the old lady appears behind the door, staring the sleeping Paul. Janice wakes up to go to Paul's bedroom where a scared Paul tells her mother that he saw the old lady telling him that her father and son had been drowned by the aquarium. After which, Paul stays behind his bedroom as Janice tries to put the mask from the aquarium away, informing Aciana to get the mask away from their condo unit. Paul was seen playing with a ball in his bed when suddenly, the water starts to rise from the aquarium. Janice finds a mallet to destroy the aquarium. Aciana was seen holding the mask, as the mask suddenly attacks Aciana in mid-air, possessing her body.

As the water starts to rise inside his bedroom, Paul tries to open the door but cannot open as he screams for his mother for help. Janice tries to break the doorknob with a mallet, seemingly unbreakable. Paul still screams for his mother for help as the water starts to rise higher. Janice tries to break the doorknob again only to be stopped by Aciana, possessed by the mask as she throws her to the ground. Benjie arrived to the condo to find out what happened to them. Janice tells Aciana what happened to her, as she throws her mallet to Janice. Paul was still trapped in his water-filled bedroom when he notices the creature from the aquarium was the old lady's drowned son. Benjie climbs up to their condo unit, as he knocks the possessed Aciana out. Janice tells Benjie that Paul was trapped in the room. Benjie goes to the vent to save his son from drowning in his bedroom from the creature. Benjie destroys the aquarium as a portal sucks all of the water out and the creature. As the aquarium was already destroyed, Janice, Benjie, and Paul reconcile.

"Lihim ng San Joaquin"
A married couple tried settling on a village, so isolated that even the carabao cart driver refused to enter, leaving them to walk to the town on their own. They were then welcomed by the villagers, who, unbeknownst to them are Aswangs. They fended off Aswangs per suggestion of a human who became a slave to the aswangs. They eventually exit the village, but not after killing aswangs, including the leader.

Cast

Poso
Ai-Ai delas Alas as The Ispiritista
Gloria Romero as Lola
Rainier Castillo as Jay
Yasmien Kurdi as Laila
Marco Alcaraz as Gener
Biboy Ramirez as Lucas
Jenine Desiderio as Frida

Aquarium
Ara Mina as Janice
Ogie Alcasid as Benjie
Paul Salas as Paul
Wilma Doesn't as Aciana
Reggie Curley as Alex
Lui Manansala as Matandang Babae

Lihim ng San Joaquin
Mark Anthony Fernandez as Rene
Tanya Garcia as Rene's wife
Elizabeth Oropesa as Sael's wife
Nonie Buencamino as Sael
Ronnie Lazaro as Blind Man
Jess Evardone as Magsasaka

Accolades

See also
Shake, Rattle & Roll (film series)
List of ghost films

References

External links

2005 films
2005 horror films
Philippine horror films
2k5
2000s comedy horror films
Regal Entertainment films
2005 comedy films
Films directed by Rico Maria Ilarde